Furkan Kircicek (born 28 September 1996) is a German professional footballer who plays as a forward for Chemnitzer FC.

Career
Kircicek signed for Türkgücü München on a free transfer from FC Memmingen in the summer of 2019. He made his 3. Liga debut for Türkgücü München on 19 September 2020 as a substitute in a 2–2 draw away to FC Bayern Munich II. He signed for Chemnitzer FC in June 2021 on a contract of undisclosed length.

References

External links
 
 

1996 births
Living people
German footballers
Association football forwards
SpVgg Kaufbeuren players
FC Memmingen players
Türkgücü München players
Chemnitzer FC players
Oberliga (football) players
Regionalliga players
3. Liga players
Sportspeople from Füssen
Footballers from Bavaria